The Slava is a river in Tulcea County, Romania. Near Lunca it discharges into Lake Golovița, a former lagoon of the Black Sea.

References

Rivers of Romania
0Slava
Rivers of Tulcea County